Thomas W. Harnisch (born January 16, 1947) is a former Democratic member of the Wisconsin State Senate. He represented the state's 31st Senate District from 1975 to 1983.

Early life
Born in La Crosse, Wisconsin, Harnisch graduated from Gale-Ettrick High School. He earned a bachelor's degree from University of Wisconsin–Madison and a law degree from University of Minnesota Law School.

Wisconsin Senate
Harnisch took interest in higher education and conservation during his two terms in the Senate. He crafted legislation creating the University of Wisconsin School of Veterinary Medicine  and was one of the leaders in creating the Robert M. La Follette School of Public Affairs at the University of Wisconsin–Madison. He also helped create a graduate program in energy analysis and policy at the University of Wisconsin–Madison.

Harnisch authored the Wisconsin Farmland Preservation Act, a state program designed to preserve farmland, provide property tax relief to farmers, and prevent soil erosion. He was the architect of the Wisconsin Conservation Corps, a conservation and youth employment program modeled after the Civilian Conservation Corps. Harnisch introduced the legislation in 1981, which was vetoed by Governor Lee S. Dreyfus. The bill was reintroduced by Thomas A. Loftus and signed into law in 1983. The program remained active until 2003. He was also an early proponent of state policies to encourage recycling.

Post-Senate activities
Harnisch remained active in politics as Wisconsin co-chair of the 1988 presidential campaign of Al Gore, later as a Gore delegate at the 1988 Democratic National Convention. He was long affiliated with the Wisconsin Towns Association later in his career.

He is married with five children and resides in Neillsville, Wisconsin.

Notes

1947 births
Living people
People from Neillsville, Wisconsin
Politicians from La Crosse, Wisconsin
University of Wisconsin–Madison alumni
University of Minnesota Law School alumni
Wisconsin lawyers
Democratic Party Wisconsin state senators